Lynn "Tubby" Howard (June 10, 1894 – May 30, 1969) was a player in the National Football League.

Howard was born and lived in Mondovi, Wisconsin. He played with the Green Bay Packers for two seasons. He played at the collegiate level at Indiana University, Ripon College, and the University of Wisconsin-Madison.

See also
List of Green Bay Packers players

References

External links

1894 births
1969 deaths
People from Mondovi, Wisconsin
Sportspeople from Bloomington, Indiana
Players of American football from Wisconsin
Green Bay Packers players
Ripon College (Wisconsin) alumni
University of Wisconsin–Madison alumni
Indiana Hoosiers football players
Ripon Red Hawks football players
Wisconsin Badgers football players
Burials in Wisconsin